is the film adaptation of the 2010–2011 Kamen Rider franchise drama Kamen Rider OOO. The film was released on August 6, 2011, alongside Kaizoku Sentai Gokaiger the Movie: The Flying Ghost Ship.

The film introduces Kamen Rider OOO's  and the debut of Kamen Rider Fourzes titular character.

Synopsis
While leading an expedition in Thuringia, Germany, Kousei Kougami and Erika Satonaka unearth the tomb of an alchemist named Gara. With the seal broken, Gara uses his magic to revive himself, capture Kougami and Satonaka, raise a tower protected by a magical barrier, and transport it to Japan. Eiji Hino, Ankh, and Akira Date investigate and battle knights emerging from the tower. Their fight attracts the Greeed and Gara, who steals most of the combatants' Core Medals and attempts to kill a young boy named Shun Wakaba. After Hino rescues Shun, Gara announces his intention to become the ruler of a new world before Shintaro Goto arrives and reveals who Gara is. Ankh senses a being similar to Gara and leads the group to a girl named Bell, who is amassing human desire to power Gara's doomsday machine.

As the machine activates, Hino, Hina Izumi, and several civilians are transported to the Edo period. He attempts to keep the peace between the present and past individuals until the Nue Yummy attacks him. Hino borrows Date's Rider equipment after losing his, before partially regaining his equipment and escaping with Izumi. As Tokugawa Yoshimune dispels rumors about Hino, Shun reveals to the latter his mother, Satsuki, was kidnapped and possessed by Gara. Meanwhile, Kougami convinces Gara to use Hino's infinite desire to accelerate his plot.

The next day, Hino fights the Nue Yummy again, but is overpowered until Izumi, Yoshimune, and the Edo civilians help him destroy it. Bell appears before Hino and offers him the choice of returning to his time while everyone else is erased from existence. He agrees on the condition that he be allowed to bring his family with him. Bell grants his wish, but realizes too late that he considers everyone in the world his family. Gara's machine is overloaded while the displaced individuals are returned to their proper time periods.

After Date and Goto destroy the barrier protecting it, Hino and Shun storm Gara's tower. As Kougami and Satonaka secretly break out, Gara assumes his true monstrous form to battle Hino. Shun's presence allows Hino to free Satsuki before the fight is interrupted by a crash-landing Kamen Rider Fourze, who befriends Hino before the pair knock Gara into his tower. As Fourze leaves to return to school on time, Gara transforms into a dragon and overpowers Hino and Date until the Greeed give Hino their remaining Core Medals so he can destroy Gara with Date's help.

Cast
 : 
 , : 
 : 
 : 
 : 
 : 
 : 
 : 
 : 
 : 
 : 
 : 
 : 
 , : 
 : 
 : 
 : 
 : 
 : 
 Rocker: 
 
 
 : 
 : 
 : 
 : 
 O-Scanner Voice: 
 Narration, Birth Driver Voice, Birth Buster Voice:

Songs
Theme song

Lyrics: Shoko Fujibayashi
Composition & Arrangement: Shuhei Naruse
Artist: Ken Matsudaira feat. Eiji & Ankh (Shu Watanabe & Ryosuke Miura)

References

External links
Official website for The Shogun and the 21 Core Medals

2011 films
OOO Wonderful: The Shogun and the 21 Core Medals
Crossover tokusatsu films
Films about time travel
Films directed by Takayuki Shibasaki
Films set in Edo
Japanese 3D films
OOO